Disaster Management Directorate is a department of the Ministry of Disaster Management and Relief and responsible for government management of natural disasters in Bangladesh and is located in Dhaka, Bangladesh.

History
Disaster Management Directorate was founded in 2012 by the Bangladesh Awami League led government in 2012. The directorate was formed through the passage of Disaster Management Act, 2012 in the Parliament of Bangladesh.

References

Government agencies of Bangladesh
2012 establishments in Bangladesh
Emergency services in Bangladesh
Organisations based in Dhaka